Shantaram Tukaram More is a member of the 13th Maharashtra Legislative Assembly. He represents the Bhiwandi Rural Assembly Constituency. He belongs to the Shiv Sena.

Positions held
 2014: Elected to Maharashtra Legislative Assembly

See also
 Bhiwandi Lok Sabha constituency

References

External links
 Shiv Sena Official website

Maharashtra MLAs 2014–2019
Living people
Shiv Sena politicians
People from Thane district
Marathi politicians
Year of birth missing (living people)